Isabel Martínez may refer to:
 Isabel Perón (Isabel Martínez de Perón), Argentine politician
 Isabel Martínez (actress), Mexican actress and comedian
 Isabel Martínez (athlete), Spanish long-distance runner